The 2013 Eskişehir Cup was a professional tennis tournament played on hard courts. It was the 1st edition of the tournament which was part of the 2013 ATP Challenger Tour. It took place in Eskişehir, Turkey between 15 and 21 July 2013.

Singles main-draw entrants

Seeds

 1 Rankings are as of July 9, 2013.

Other entrants
The following players received wildcards into the singles main draw:
  Durukan Durmuş
  Barış Ergüden
  Cem İlkel
  Anıl Yüksel

The following players received entry as alternates into the singles main draw:
  Blaž Rola

The following players received entry from the qualifying draw:
  Alexandros Jakupovic
  Alexander Kudryavtsev
  David Rice
  Filip Veger

The following players received entry as lucky losers into the singles main draw:
  Gilad Ben Zvi
  Jaime Pulgar-García

Champions

Singles

 David Goffin def.  Marsel İlhan, 4–6, 7–5, 6–2

Doubles

 Marin Draganja /  Mate Pavić def.  Sanchai Ratiwatana /  Sonchat Ratiwatana, 6–3, 3–6, [10–7]

External links
Official Website

Eskisehir Cup
Eskişehir Cup
2013 in Turkish tennis